The men's vault (or "jumps") event was part of the gymnastics programme at the 1928 Summer Olympics held in Amsterdam. It was one of seven gymnastics events for men and it was contested for the fourth time after 1896, 1904, and 1924. Scores from the vault event were added to the results from other individual apparatus events to give aggregate scores for the individual and team all-around events. There were 85 competitors from 11 nations. Each nation had a team of 8 gymnasts; three of the 88 men did not start. The event was won by Eugen Mack of Switzerland, the nation's first victory in the event and first medal since 1896. Emanuel Löffler gave Czechoslovakia its second consecutive silver medal. Stane Derganc's bronze was Yugoslavia's first medal in the event.

Background

This was the fourth appearance of the event, which is one of the five apparatus events held every time there were apparatus events at the Summer Olympics (no apparatus events were held in 1900, 1908, 1912, or 1920). Six of the top 10 gymnasts from 1924 returned: gold medalist Frank Kriz of the United States, silver medalist Jan Koutný of Czechoslovakia, fourth-place finisher Leon Štukelj of Yugoslavia, sixth-place finisher Janez Porenta of Yugoslavia, seventh-place finisher Ferdinando Mandrini of Italy, and tenth-place finisher Ladislav Vácha of Czechoslovakia. The event was not held at the 1926 world championships and there was no clear favorite.

The Netherlands made its debut in the men's vault. Hungary competed for the first time since 1896. The other nine nations had all competed in 1924. Switzerland and the United States were each making their third appearance, tied for most of any nation.

Competition format

In the early Olympics, the vault format changed considerably. For 1928, the vault competition consisted of two different jumps: one over a sideways (perpendicular to the approach) pommel horse and one of a lengthwise (parallel to the approach) over a vaulting horse (with no pommels). The pommel horse jump was of a set form while the gymnast could choose the skills to use for the vaulting horse jump. The combined score for the two jumps, of a maximum 30 points, was the result of the event.

The vault was one of the apparatus used in the individual and team all-around scores.

Schedule

Results
Source: Official results; De Wael

References

Gymnastics at the 1928 Summer Olympics
Men's 1928
Men's events at the 1928 Summer Olympics